Terenure is a suburb of Kempton Park, in Gauteng province, South Africa. According to the 2011 census, Terenure and Terenure Extension had a population of 4,144 and 6,579 respectively.

References

Suburbs of Kempton Park, Gauteng